Donald Clark Johnston (2 December 1894 – 13 September 1918) was an English first-class cricketer and British Army officer.

The son of John and Frances Johnston, he was born in Shanghai in December 1894. He was educated at Malvern College, before going up to Brasenose College, Oxford. While studying at Oxford, Johnston played first-class cricket for Oxford University in 1914, making two appearances against G. J. V. Weigall's XI at Oxford and L. G. Robinson's XI at Attleborough. 

Johnston served in the British Army during the First World War, being commissioned as a temporary second lieutenant in the Cameronians (Scottish Rifles) in October 1914. By October 1917, he was a temporary captain, a rank which he relinquished having ceased to command a battalion. He was again made an acting captain in January 1918, before relinquishing the rank once more in July 1918. He had been promoted to the full rank of lieutenant the previous month. Johnston was seriously wounded during an assault on Hill 158 on 30 July 1918 as part of the Second Battle of the Marne. He died of his wounds on 13 September 1918 at Beugneux in France.

References

External links

1894 births
1918 deaths
Sportspeople from Shanghai
People educated at Malvern College
Alumni of Brasenose College, Oxford
English cricketers
Oxford University cricketers
Cameronians officers
British Army personnel of World War I
British military personnel killed in World War I